"Cuando Me Enamoro" (English: "When I Fall in Love") is a Hispanic pop song written and performed by Spanish pop singer-songwriter Enrique Iglesias and featuring Dominican singer-songwriter Juan Luis Guerra released on 26 April 2010, as the first single from his ninth studio album. The song is the main-theme of the Mexican telenovela of the same title starring Silvia Navarro and Juan Soler. This is the second time since "Nunca Te Olvidaré" that a song of Enrique Iglesias was chosen as the main-theme of a telenovela. "Cuando Me Enamoro" became a contender for Latin Grammy Award for Song of the Year. The single has sold around a million digital downloads worldwide to the date. This song was dedicated for K,O,M.

Music video

Development
The music video, directed by Jessy Terrero, was filmed along with Guerra in the elementary school St. Patrick & Assumption/All Saints, in Jersey City, New Jersey. The full music video premiered on Iglesias' Vevo account on 21 May 2010. , the video has been viewed more than 620 million times on YouTube.

Synopsis
In the story of the video, Iglesias and Guerra are guest stars invited to sing at a school. The music video simply starts when the school principal presents them to the students and they begin to sing. The video alternates between the stage performance and three vignettes that exemplify falling in love: a student in class contrives to get his friend in trouble so he can move into his friend's seat, which is next to his crush and allows him to pass her a "Do you like me," note; an un-athletic student is pummeled at dodge ball and then rescued by a girl who likes him and has a killer throw; a straight-A student who contrives to get sent to the principal's office because he is infatuated by her. The video has the participation of Ugly Betty actress Ana Ortiz as the principal Michelle Gomez.

Awards and nominations

Chart performance
The song debuted on number #22 on the Billboard Hot Latin Songs, on the Tropical Songs the song debuted at number #19 and number #8 on the Latin Pop Songs. On Spain the song is charted at number #35. It is the twenty-first time that a song by Iglesias topped on the Billboard Hot Latin Songs since Gracias a Tí (Remix) featuring Wisin & Yandel in 2009 as well as Juan Luis Guerra's seventh time to reach #1 on Hot Latin Tracks. This is also the third time a self-replacement happened in the history of the Hot Latin Tracks. The track spent 17 non-consecutive weeks at No # 1 at Hot Latin Track.

On the Billboard Hot 100, the song peaked at number #89 and was Iglesias' highest-charting Spanish single of his career at the time, surpassing "Lloro Por Ti", which reached #91.

Track listing

Charts and certifications

Weekly charts

Certifications

Year-end charts

Decade-end charts

All-time charts

See also
List of number-one songs of 2010 (Mexico)

References

External links
"Cuando Me Enamoro" music video
Enrique Iglesias official website

2010 singles
Enrique Iglesias songs
Juan Luis Guerra songs
Bachata songs
Songs written by Enrique Iglesias
Music videos directed by Jessy Terrero
Monitor Latino Top General number-one singles
Telenovela theme songs
Songs written by Descemer Bueno
2010 songs

pl:Cuando Me Enamoro